Waldo V. Howard (October 2, 1841 – 1927) was an American architect practicing in the city of Brockton, Massachusetts and its suburbs.

Life
Howard was born in 1841 in Brockton, then known as North Bridgewater.  His father, Linus, was a farmer.  In 1881 Howard married Mary (Eaton) Nutter, of Amesbury.  They had no children.  He had opened his office by 1882.  In 1889, he took Fred T. Austin as partner in the firm of Howard & Austin.  Austin left in 1896 to work alone, before becoming the partner of Charles A. Brigham (Austin & Brigham) in Boston that same year.  In later life, Howard was appointed City Architect of Brockton. Howard died in 1927.

Howard was fairly prolific in Plymouth County, and was competent in the major late-nineteenth century styles. Howard worked in Brockton during the 1880s and 90s, with its population more than quadrupling during his career.  He and fellow Brockton architect Wesley Lyng Minor designed most of the city's major structures during that period.

Architectural works

W. V. Howard, until 1889
 1882 - Aaron M. Herrod House, 772 N. Main St, Brockton, Massachusetts
 Demolished.
 1882 - Robbins B. Grover House, 336 Main St, Brockton, Massachusetts
 Demolished.
 1883 - Joslyn Block, 23 Centre St, Brockton, Massachusetts
 Demolished.
 1884 - Central Fire Station, 40 Pleasant St, Brockton, Massachusetts
 1889 - First Universalist Church, 34 Cottage St, Brockton, Massachusetts

Howard & Austin, 1889-1896
 1889 - Kingman Block, 142 Main St, Brockton, Massachusetts
 Replaced by Martin & Hall's Kennedy Building in 1916.
 1890 - Gardner Block, 62 Centre St, Brockton, Massachusetts
 Demolished in 2013.
 1894 - Littleton Town Hall, 125 Main St, Littleton, New Hampshire
 1896 - Hyannis Yacht Club, Pleasant St, Hyannis, Massachusetts
 Demolished.
 1896 - Moses A. Packard House, 647 Main St, Brockton, Massachusetts

W. V. Howard, after 1896
 1896 - Washburn Library, 32 Union St, East Bridgewater, Massachusetts
 1897 - William L. Wright House, 162 Highland St, Brockton, Massachusetts
 1898 - Fire Station No. 3, 914 N Main St, Brockton, Massachusetts
 1899 - Jenkins Block, 91 Washington St, Whitman, Massachusetts
 Upper floors removed after a 1930 fire.
 1905 - Brockton Armory, 233 Warren Ave, Brockton, Massachusetts
 1907 - Gifford School, 285 W Main St, Avon, Massachusetts
 Burned in 1952.
 1908 - Center School, 155 W Center St, West Bridgewater, Massachusetts
 Demolished.
 1914 - Huntington School Annex, 1121 Warren Ave, Brockton, Massachusetts
 1915 - George S. Paine School, 211 Crescent St, Brockton, Massachusetts
 Now the Adult Learning Center.

References

1841 births
1927 deaths
Architects from Massachusetts
19th-century American architects
20th-century American architects
People from Brockton, Massachusetts